Events from the year 1924 in Michigan.

Office holders

State office holders
 Governor of Michigan: Alex J. Groesbeck (Republican)
 Lieutenant Governor of Michigan: Thomas Read (Republican) 
 Michigan Attorney General: Andrew B. Dougherty (Republican)
 Michigan Secretary of State: Charles J. DeLand (Republican)
 Speaker of the Michigan House of Representatives: George W. Welsh (Republican)
 Majority Leader of the Michigan Senate:

Mayors of major cities
 Mayor of Detroit: John C. Lodge/John W. Smith 
 Mayor of Grand Rapids: Julius Tisch/Elvin Swarthout
 Mayor of Flint: David R. Cuthbertson/Judson L. Transue
 Mayor of Lansing: Alfred H. Doughty

Federal office holders
 U.S. Senator from Michigan: James J. Couzens (Republican)
 U.S. Senator from Michigan: Woodbridge N. Ferris (Democrat) 
 House District 1: Robert H. Clancy (Democrat)
 House District 2: Earl C. Michener (Republican)
 House District 3: Arthur B. Williams (Republican)
 House District 4: John C. Ketcham (Republican)
 House District 5: Carl E. Mapes (Republican)
 House District 6: Grant M. Hudson (Republican)
 House District 7: Louis C. Cramton (Republican)
 House District 8: Bird J. Vincent (Republican)
 House District 9: James C. McLaughlin (Republican)
 House District 10: Roy O. Woodruff (Republican)
 House District 11: Frank D. Scott (Republican)
 House District 12: W. Frank James (Republican)
 House District 13: Clarence J. McLeod (Republican)

Population

Sports

Baseball
 1924 Detroit Tigers season – Under player-manager Ty Cobb, the Tigers compiled an 82–72 record and finished third in the American League. The team's statistical leaders included Johnny Bassler with a .346 batting average, Harry Heilmann with 10 home runs and 114 RBIs, and Cobb with 211 hits. Earl Whitehill led the pitching staff with a 17–9 record and 233 innings pitched. 
 1924 Michigan Wolverines baseball season –

American football
 1924 Michigan Wolverines football team – Under head coach George Little, the Wolverines compiled a 6–2 record, outscored opponents by a combined score of 155 to 54, and finished fourth in the Big Ten Conference.  Quarterback Tod Rockwell led the team in scoring.
 1924 Michigan State Spartans football team – Under head coach Ralph H. Young, the Spartans compiled a 5–3 record.
 1924 Michigan State Normal Normalites football team – Under head coach James Brown, the Normalites compiled a 2–5–1 record.
 1924 Detroit Titans football team – Under head coach James F. Duffy, the Titans finished with a 4–5 record.
 1924 Central Michigan Normalites football team – Under head coach Lester Barnard, the Central Michigan football team compiled a 7–1 record.
 1924 Western State Hilltoppers football team – Under head coach Earl Martineau, the Hilltoppers compiled a 5–1–1 record.

Basketball
 1923–24 Michigan Wolverines men's basketball team – Under head coach E. J. Mather, the Wolverines compiled a 10–7 record. Howard M. Birks was the team captain.

Ice hockey
 1923–24 Michigan Wolverines men's ice hockey team –

Other
 Michigan Open

Chronology of events

January

February

March

April

May

June

July

August

September

October

November
 November 4 - A number of elections occurred, including:
President of the United States - Incumbent president Calvin Coolidge won in Michigan with 75.37% of the popular vote.
United States Senate - Incumbent Republican United States Senator James J. Couzens was for the first time elected to the Senate after being appointed to fill the vacancy left by Truman Handy Newberry's resignation in 1922.
United States House of Representatives - All of Michigan's 13 U.S. Representatives won re-election except for Democrat Robert H. Clancy, who was defeated by Republican John B. Sosnowski, making Michigan's delegation to the House entirely Republican.
 Michigan Governor - Incumbent Republican governor, Alex J. Groesbeck, defeated Democratic nominee Edward Frensdorf.
 Michigan House of Representatives - Cora Reynolds Anderson became the first woman and the first Native American to be elected to the state House.

December

Births
 January 1 – Arthur Danto, art critic and professor, in Ann Arbor, MI
 January 31 – A. Alfred Taubman, businessman, in Pontiac, MI
 March 6 – Ed Mierkowicz, baseball outfielder, in Wyandotte, MI
 April 18 – Connie Binsfeld, 60th Lieutenant Governor of Michigan, in Munising, MI
 May 3 – Isadore Singer, mathematician, in Detroit
 June 3 – Jay Van Andel, co-founder of Amway, in Grand Rapids, MI
 July 10 – Major Holley, jazz upright bassist, in Detroit
 July 22 – Margaret Whiting, singer, in Detroit
 July 23 – Avern Cohn, federal judge, in Detroit
 October 15 – Lee Iacocca, automobile executive, in Allentown, PA
 December 6 – Dorothy Comstock Riley, lawyer and judge, in Detroit
 December 31 – Frank J. Kelley, Michigan Attorney General (1961–1999), in Detroit

Gallery of 1924 births

Deaths
May 11 - Moses Fleetwood Walker, first African-American to play MLB and a U-M alumnus, at age 67 in Cleveland
 August 3 - Charles E. Townsend, United States Senator from Michigan (1911-1923), at age 67 in Jackson
August 25 - John Owen, set world record in 100-yard dash, at age 63 in a horseback riding accident on Mackinac Island

Gallery of 1924 deaths

References